EKIP (translated from , the Russian acronym for "", which means "Ecology and Progress") is the Soviet and Russian project of a multifunctional aerodrome-free aircraft, built according to the "flying wing" scheme, with an elliptically shaped fuselage. Also known by its Russian nickname of Tarielka (meaning "plate" or "saucer"), the EKIP can land on water or unpaved ground through the use of an air cushion instead of a wheeled undercarriage. The EKIP is a short takeoff and landing (STOL) aircraft.

A special feature of the design is the presence of a special system of stabilization and reduction of drag, made in the form of a vortex control system of the boundary layer flowing around the stern surface of the device, as well as an additional flat-bed reactive system for controlling the device at low speeds and in takeoff and landing modes.

The need for a stabilization system and reduction of drag is due to the fact that the body of the apparatus, made in the form of a thick wing of small elongation, on the one hand, has a high aerodynamic quality and is able to create lifting force several times higher than a thin wing, on the other hand, it has low stability due to the disruption of flows and the formation of zones of turbulence. The use of the "bearing wing" scheme provides a useful internal volume several times larger than that of promising aircraft of equal payload. Such a body increases the comfort and safety of flights, significantly saves fuel and reduces operating costs.

Development 

The EKIP concept was developed by Professor Lev Nikolayevich Schukin (Russian: Лев Николаевич Щукин), an engineer trained in aircraft engine development who also worked for the NPO Energia rocket design corporation and participated in the Soviet portion of the Apollo–Soyuz Test Project in 1975, the first US-Soviet space linkup. In 1978, the EKIP concept was first proposed to Soviet military authorities, and in 1979, Schukin founded the EKIP NPP (scientific-production enterprise), which was based in Podlipki (Korolev). In 1980, the EKIP project initiated laboratory studies and engineering work. The first bench test on a small-scale model was conducted in 1982 at the top-secret Geodesia research institute in Krasnoarmeysk, Moscow Oblast. Major work on the still top-secret project began in 1987, and flight tests of the first scale model began in 1990–1991. This first radio-controlled flown aircraft was called the L-1 model, and it had a T-tail empennage. Initially the flights took place at the Sokol Aircraft Plant, which was known for producing MiG fighter aircraft. After radio-control problems caused the scale model to crash during a flight in snowy conditions, the Nizhny Novgorod manufacturing plant banned further EKIP test flights. Scale model testing was then moved in April 1990 to the Saratov Aviation Plant, where Yakovlev aircraft were manufactured. That year, the EKIP Aviation Concern (EKIP AK) was founded by the EKIP NPP, Saratov Aviation Plant, and the Triumf NPP.

The concept made its public debut in 1992 at the Mosaeroshou (the predecessor to the MAKS air show), and it appeared at other exhibitions over the next two years, including the 1993 Paris Air Show. Two  span, L-2 models were successfully flown by remote control in the middle of that year.

In 1994, reports about the EKIP began to appear in Western media, and the L3 model (which could carry 400 passengers or 40 tonnes of cargo) had earned provisional orders for 1,500 aircraft from the North Siberian Development Board, a Russian food distribution agency. At this time, the Saratov Aviation Plant was building an unmanned,  span L2-3 model for flight testing. The all-metal L2-3 model would be powered by two Saturn/Lyulka AL-34 engines, which generate an air cushion for takeoff and landing and power the boundary layer control system. The AL-34 turboshaft engines, which were designed for light aircraft and rotorcraft, were placed centrally inside the hull. In addition to its two AL-34 engines, this larger variant would include a pair of Kuznetsov NK-92 ducted propfan engines to provide  of forward thrust.

By February 1995, ground tests were conducted on the  test aircraft, with plant tests to be completed in June and unmanned test flights scheduled to begin in October. A second  test aircraft was to be assembled in Saratov by the end of the year, with manned flights to be attempted in 1996.

Following the breakup of the Soviet Union, the Russian government granted the EKIP project 1.2 billion rubles of funding in June 1993. However, by the time the money was received, hyperinflation had eroded its purchasing power by a factor of eight. Construction of two full-size EKIP vehicles with a total take-off weight of  had begun. The hulls and control surfaces were built at Energia in Korolev, and final assembly was performed at Saratov. In 1997, Russia planned to invest CAD$12 million into the EKIP project, with the a new round of flight tests slated for 1999. It was supported at the state level Ministry of Defense Industry, Ministry of Defense (lead customer) and Ministry of Forestry. In 1999, the development of the EKIP apparatus in Korolev was included as a separate line in the country's budget, but funding was interrupted and no money was received. Due to the lack of funds, the project was shelved in June of that year. The creator of EKIP, Lev Schukin, was worried about the fate of the project and, after numerous attempts to continue the project with personal funds, he died of a heart attack in 2001.

In September 2003, the Saratov Aviation Plant signed an agreement to work with the United States Naval Air Systems Command (NAVAIR) to develop the EKIP. The flight test program was to be conducted in Maryland at Naval Air Station Patuxent River's Webster Field within three to five years.

The binational agreement was followed by a formal contract in April 2004. NAVAIR and Saratov would jointly produce the EKIP, which would be targeted for use in extinguishing forest fires. The United States would pay dividends to Russia after the sales and production of the EKIP started. Saratov would construct the initial flight test prototype, which would weigh  and be delivered to NAVAIR as early as 2006 for testing. However, by July 2005, NAVAIR said that it no longer planned to pursue EKIP development.

From 2005 through 2009, a consortium of ten European and Russian research groups from universities and industrial enterprises conducted European Union-funded studies on the currents created by the wing, similar to the EKIP fairing. The working title of the project was VortexCell2050. The EKIP aircraft was also presented at air shows through at least 2010. Also, the PW206 turboshaft and PW305A turbofan engines from Pratt & Whitney Canada and the Progress D-18T had replaced the Saturn/Lyulka AL-34 and Kuznetsov NK-92 in the EKIP offerings, as those two engines never reached the production stage. After the closure of the Saratov Aviation Plant, the EKIP prototype was transferred to a museum in Ivanovskoye village, near Moscow. The prototype has been on public display since 2011.

Design 

The unusual shape of the EKIP aircraft has been described as resembling a poached egg, beetle, cheese bell, or overturned bowl. It is designed to offer greater volume for passengers, cargo, and fuel compared to typical airliners. The flying wing fuselage has a center section and side sections. The cockpit, passenger cabin, and cargo storage are located in the center section. The fuel tanks, fuel feed systems, engines, and fire extinguishing equipment are in the side sections. Below each fuselage side section is an air-cushion skeg, which extends longitudinally in a straight line from in front of the fuselage's leading edge to behind the trailing edge. In preparation for an aircraft landing, the air cushions are inflated and expanded, and then they are deflated and folded inside the aircraft. Passenger versions of the EKIP would have large, dimmable, load-bearing windows, and the cabin noise level would be targeted for a maximum of 75 decibels (dB).

To reduce aerodynamic resistance, a boundary layer control (BLC) system is used, which ensures a continuous, separation-free airflow around the aircraft by using a set of consecutive transverse vortices on the back surface of the EKIP. The system is made of parallel pairs of slots. The front slot of the pair ejects air out of the vehicle, while the back slot of the pair sucks air back in. Due to this, the machine moves in a laminar aerodynamic flow with less resistance. The system allows low energy consumption to provide low aerodynamic resistance and stability of the device for angle of attack up to 40° (in cruise, takeoff and landing). To improve the flying wing's lifting force and drag coefficient by a factor of 1.5 to 2, the BLC system needs the equivalent of only 3–6% of the rated power of the forward thrust engines. Taking advantage of the BLC system gives the EKIP aircraft a high thickness-to-chord ratio of 30–35%, compared to 8–10% for the wing of a conventional airliner.

To fix the stability issues associated with flying saucers, the EKIP implemented automated control technology from the Soviet Union's Buran space shuttle, which in 1988 became the first space orbiter to make an automated landing back on Earth. It uses directable air flow to provide stability and flight control. In addition to flaps, the EKIP's stubby wings have reaction control thrusters at their tips, which stabilize the aircraft at lower speeds than possible on conventional, cruciform-shaped aircraft. The tail has nozzles for horizontal and vertical thrust vectoring, which limits any undesirable yaw and roll of the aircraft.

The EKIP is capable of takeoffs and landings on water; the  L3-1 model can depart or arrive in  waves.

Power plant 

An EKIP aircraft uses two sets of engines. The first set is used to provide forward thrust. The second set pulls the air over the aircraft to add to the EKIP's velocity and reduce aerodynamic drag through boundary layer control. The latter set, which are referred to as auxiliary turboshaft engines, are run economically during cruise, but they work at maximum power during takeoff and landing to create an air cushion. Both types of engines are placed inside of the rear hull.

The dual-generator AL-34 engine can be powered using jet fuel (kerosene-based) or cryogenic fuels such as hydrogen and natural gas. It is also designed to work with aquazine, a Russian alternative fuel in development that is made with a water emulsifier. Aquazine consists of up to 58% water emulsified in hydrocarbons, such as low-grade gasoline or processed products of natural gas or associated gas. The emulsified fuel is claimed to have a total octane number of 85, even though it is made from gasoline waste products having an octane number of 50. The EKIP designers also investigated a water injection-like system in which conventional jet fuel was burned, but the water condensate from the exhaust gas was collected and added to the fuel mix.

If the forward thrust engines become disabled, the EKIP can make a trouble-free landing on unprepared ground sites or on the water, even on only one auxiliary engine. The descent rate is claimed to peak at only .

Variants

Civilian 
 Unmanned Aerial Vehicle: EKIP-AULA L2-3, EKIP-2;
 For passenger traffic (2 or more people);
 For transportation;
 Patrol service for catastrophe monitoring and forest fire detection: EKIP-2P.

Military 
 Amphibious assault vehicle (in anti-submarine, patrol, amphibious assault variants).
 Fighting vehicle.

The range of weapons that can be installed on EKIP, great due to the large carrying capacity and high maneuverability of the device.

Specifications

See also 
 Aeroscraft
 Boeing Pelican
 Thermoplan

References

Citations

Bibliography

External links

 
 
 
 
 
 
 Aircraft of the new generation ECIP. Russia (in Russian). Retrieved 24 January 2020.

Ekranoplans
Flying wings
Proposed aircraft of Russia
Abandoned military aircraft projects of the Soviet Union
Airships of Russia
Hybrid vehicles
Russian inventions